Deinum is a village in Waadhoeke municipality in Friesland, The Netherlands. Before 2018, the village was part of the Menameradiel municipality.

Population 
In 2017 Deinum had a total of 915 residents, of which 508 male and 482 female. The amount of non-western immigrants was 1% or less.

Ages 
The largest age group in Deinum was between 45 and 65 years old, taking up 33% of the total population.

Households 
Deinum had a total of 345 households, of which 46% had children and 54% had not. The average size of a household was 2.6 persons.

Notable buildings
 The Protestant church of Deinum

Transportation
Deinum railway station
Leeuwarden vrij-baan

Gallery

References

External links

Waadhoeke
Populated places in Friesland